The 2010–11 College Hockey America women's ice hockey season marked the continuation of the annual tradition of competitive ice hockey among College Hockey America members.

Offseason
 August 2: Former NCAA All-American player Sabrina Harbec will join the Syracuse Orange coaching staff for the 2010-11 season.
 August 27: Mercyhurst Lakers player Meghan Agosta was announced as a finalist for the Women's Sports Foundation's 2010 Sportswoman of the Year Team Award. It is awarded to the top female athlete (NCAA, Olympic, professional) who has demonstrated exceptional play in helping her team win a championship.
 September 28: In the USA Today/USA Hockey Magazine Women's College Hockey Poll, the Mercyhurst Lakers have been voted as the pre-season Number 3.

Preseason

College Hockey America Preseason Coaches' Poll

Exhibition

Season standings

Regular season

News and notes

October
 October 1: Mercyhurst Lakers player Meghan Agosta joined Jesse Scanzano as only the second Mercyhurst player to have 100 career assists. She picked up the assist in the second period of the game against WCHA team St. Cloud State.
 October 1: By tying Northwestern in the season opener, it marked the first time that the Syracuse Orange started the season unbeaten. Stefanie Marty had two goals in the game. Northeastern featured her twin sister Julia Marty. It was the first time the sisters had ever played against each other in their NCAA careers.
 October 8: With a 4-2 defeat of New Hampshire, the Orange is off to its best start in program history (1-0-1). In the win, senior transfer Ashley Cockell scored her first career goal for the Orange. Freshman goaltender Kallie Billadeau made 26 saves as she played in her first game for the Orange.
 October 15: Bailey Bram registered two assists, including her 100th career point, in a game against the Bemidji State Beavers. She became the 11th Lakers player to crack the century mark in the 4-0 win.
 October 16: In a 7-1 win against Connecticut, Isabel Menard recorded the first hat trick in Syracuse Orange women's ice hockey history (and added an assist).
 October 16: Dayna Newsom of Robert Morris accumulated a game-high three points (goal and two assists) against Northeastern. She tied her career high and it was her second multi-point game within the first five games of the season.
 As the Lakers went 6-1-0 in October 2010, Christine Bestland scored four goals, including two in a 7-3 defeat of the Robert Morris Colonials. In addition, she had six as¬sists. In her first game as a Laker, she scored a goal. She registered points in five of the seven games played and finished the month with a plus/minus rating of +13. For her efforts, she was recognized as College Hockey America's Rookie of the Month.

November

January
 January 15: Bailey Bram registered two goals and four assists for a career-high six points as Mercyhurst defeated Brown 12-0. Mercyhurst notched 12 goals in a game for the first time since the 1999-2000 season.
 January 21–22: Meghan Agosta recorded five points on two goals and three assists in a two-game sweep of Robert Morris. With the five point effort, Agosta is now just seven points away from breaking former Harvard player Julie Chu's mark of 285 points to become the NCAA all-time points leader.

February
 On February 4, 2011, Meghan Agosta became the all-time leading scorer in NCAA women's hockey history with three goals and one assist in Mercyhurst College's 6-2 win over Wayne State in Erie, Pennsylvania. Agosta's four points gave her 286 career points, one more than ex-Harvard forward Julie Chiu's record of 285 set in 2006-07. Agosta, who also owns the record for most short-handed goals and game-winning goals, added three assists in the Lakers' 3-1 win over Wayne State on February 5.
 February 25, 2011: Meghan Agosta scored her 151st career goal to become all-time leading goal scorer in NCAA history. She accomplished this in a 6-2 victory over the Robert Morris Colonials women's ice hockey program at the Mercyhurst Ice Center. She surpassed Harvard's Nicole Corriero, who set the record at 150 during the 2004-05 season. The goal was scored on the power play at 15:18 of the second period with the assist going to Bailey Bram. She later added her 152nd goal in the third period.

National rankings

In season honors

Players of the week
Throughout the conference regular season, College Hockey America offices names a player of the week each Monday.

Defensive Players of the week

Rookies of the week
Throughout the conference regular season, College Hockey America offices names a rookie of the week each Monday.

Monthly Awards

Player of the Month

Defensive Player of the Month

Rookie of the Month

Postseason

2011 CHA Women's Ice Hockey Tournament

Postseason awards
 Meghan Agosta was named CHA Tournament MVP
 Meghan Agosta, Mercyhurst, CHA Player of the Year
 Ashley Harper, Mercyhurst, Top Scholar-Athlete in College Hockey America
 Thea Imbrogno, Robert Morris, CHA Rookie of the Year
 Hillary Pattenden, Mercyhurst, 2010-11 CHA goaltending champion
 Michael Sisti, Mercyhurst, CHA coach of the year

First Team All-CHA
 Meghan Agosta, Mercyhurst
 Jenni Bauer, Niagara
 Vicki Bendus, Mercyhurst
 Cassea Scholls, 2010-11 First Team All-CHA selection
 Pamela Zgoda, Mercyhurst

Second Team All-CHA
 Bailey Bram, Mercyhurst
 Erica Owczarczak, Niagara
 Hillary Pattenden, Mercyhurst
 Jesse Scanzano, Mercyhurst
 Jill Szandzik, Wayne State

CHA All-Rookie team
 Christine Bestland, Mercyhurst
 Cari Coen, Wayne State
 Thea Imbrogno, Robert Morris
 Kristen Richards, Niagara

All-Americans
 Meghan Agosta, Mercyhurst, First Team selection

See also
 National Collegiate Women's Ice Hockey Championship
 2009–10 CHA women's ice hockey season
 2010–11 WCHA women's ice hockey season
 2010–11 ECAC women's ice hockey season
 2010–11 Hockey East women's ice hockey season

References

CHA
College Hockey America